Bulandshahr district (also spelled Bulandshahar) is a district in the Meerut region in the North Indian state of Uttar Pradesh (UP), situated between the two rivers Ganga and Yamuna. It is a part of the National Capital Region of India, and Bulandshahr is the district headquarters.

The district is situated between 28.4° south and 28.0° north latitudes and between 77.0° and 78.0° east longitudes. It is bordered by Hapur district to the north, Amroha and Sambhal districts to the east, Aligarh district to the south and Gautam Buddha Nagar district to the west.

Demographics

According to the 2011 census, Bulandshahr district had a population of 3,499,171, roughly equal to the nation of Lithuania or the US state of Connecticut. This makes it the 85th most populous district of the total 640.

Its population growth rate over the decade 2001-2011 was 20.09%. Bulandshahar has a sex ratio of 892 females for every 1000 males, and a literacy rate of 76.23%. Scheduled Castes make up 20.74% of the population.

In 1901, the population stood at 1,138,101.

At the time of the 2011 Census of India, 93.23% of the population in the district spoke Hindi and 6.58% Urdu as their first language.

Agriculture 
The district of Bulandshahar is an important grain producing agricultural district. Wheat, potatoes, maize, sugar and many others are cultivated here in large quantities.

References

External links

 Official site

 
Districts of Uttar Pradesh
Meerut division
Minority Concentrated Districts in India